Sorrento Football Club, commonly known as Sorrento FC, is a Western Australian semi-professional soccer club based in the northern Perth, Western Australia suburb of Duncraig. They currently compete in the National Premier Leagues Western Australia. The club was founded in 1972.

Current squad

Senior coaching staff
 Head coach: Trevor Morgan
 Assistant coach: Ross Greer
 Goalkeeping coach: Alan Young

Honours
 Football West Premier League Champions: 2001, 2006, 2008, 2012
 Football West State Cup Winners: 2011, 2012, 2015

References

External links
Official website

National Premier Leagues clubs
Football West State League teams
Association football clubs established in 1972
1972 establishments in Australia